The moustached antwren (Myrmotherula ignota) is a species of small Neotropical bird in the family Thamnophilidae. It has two allopatric subspecies, both sometimes considered separate monotypic species: The Griscom's antwren (M. (i.) ignota) is found the Chocó of north-western Ecuador, western Colombia and eastern Panama, and the short-billed antwren (M. (ignota) obscura) is found in the Amazon of north-eastern Peru, eastern Ecuador, south-eastern Colombia and north-western Brazil. The former has sometimes been considered conspecific with the pygmy antwren, but based on voices it has been recommended treating ignota and obscura as a subspecies of a single species. Both are found in the sub-canopy of humid lowland forests.

References

moustached antwren
Birds of the Tumbes-Chocó-Magdalena
Birds of Colombia
Birds of the Amazon Basin
Birds of the Ecuadorian Amazon
Birds of the Peruvian Amazon
moustached antwren
Taxonomy articles created by Polbot